John George Brabazon Ponsonby, 5th Earl of Bessborough PC (14 October 1809 – 28 January 1880), styled Viscount Duncannon from 1844 until 1847, was a British cricketer, courtier and Liberal politician.

Background
Born in London, Ponsonby was the eldest son of John Ponsonby, 4th Earl of Bessborough, and his wife Lady Maria Fane, third daughter of John Fane, 10th Earl of Westmorland. He was a cricketer in his youth and played five first-class matches for Marylebone Cricket Club (MCC) in the 1830s.

Political career
Ponsonby entered the House of Commons in the 1831 general election, sitting as a Whig for Bletchingley, where he was returned unopposed. He only sat for a short period, vacating his seat in July in favour of Thomas Hyde Villiers, newly appointed as a minister and requiring a seat. In October, he was offered a seat in the pocket borough of Higham Ferrers, which he held until the seat was disenfranchised at the end of 1832. During 1832, he may have spent some time at the British embassy in Russia.

Following the election, he worked for Lord Palmerston as a précis writer at the Foreign Office, from May 1833 to November 1834, and then stood as a candidate at the 1835 general election. Here, he was returned as a Liberal at Derby, though the campaign was marred by a "bizarre nervous breakdown" brought on by stress, overwork, and the recent death of his mother.

He represented Derby until May 1847, when he succeeded to the earldom on the death of his father, and took up his seat in the House of Lords. Lord Bessborough became a government minister when he was appointed Master of the Buckhounds under Lord John Russell in 1848, an office he held until the fall of the administration in 1852. He held the same office from 1852 to 1855 in Lord Aberdeen's coalition government, from 1855 to 1858 in Lord Palmerston's first administration and again from 1859 to 1866 in Palmerston's and Russell's second administrations. In January 1866 he was appointed Lord Steward of the Household under Russell, a post he held until the Liberals lost power in June 1866, and again between 1868 and 1874 in William Ewart Gladstone's first administration.

Lord Bessborough was also Lord-Lieutenant of Carlow between 1838 and his death in 1880.

Family
Lord Bessborough married Lady Frances Lambton, eldest daughter of John Lambton, 1st Earl of Durham, on 8 September 1835. She died on 18 December 1835, and on 4 October 1849, he married Lady Caroline Gordon-Lennox, eldest daughter of Charles Gordon-Lennox, 5th Duke of Richmond. There were no children from the two marriages. He died in January 1880, aged 70, and was succeeded by his younger brother Frederick.

References

External links 
 

1809 births
1880 deaths
Ponsonby, John
Lord-Lieutenants of Carlow
Ponsonby, John
Ponsonby, John
Ponsonby, John
John Ponsonby, 5th Earl of Bessborough
Ponsonby, John
Ponsonby, John
Ponsonby, John
Ponsonby, John
UK MPs who inherited peerages
English cricketers of 1826 to 1863
Masters of the Buckhounds
John 05